Senate elections were held in Egypt on 11 and 12 August 2020, with the diaspora voting on 9 and 10 August. Run-offs took place on 8–9 September (6-7 for the diaspora), and their results were announced on 16 September.

Background 
Shura Council elections were scheduled to take place in Egypt at most a year after the new House of Representatives was seated, according to Article 230 of the Egyptian Constitution of 2012. The election did not take place because the Shura Council was abolished in the 2014 constitution. However, in 2019, after the 2019 Egyptian constitutional referendum, further amendments made the parliament a bicameral body, with the Shura Council (which was abolished in 2014) restored as the Senate.

Incumbent President Abdel Fattah el-Sisi and parties supporting him have been labeled as running an authoritarian regime by international media outlets.

Several parties announced that they would boycott the elections, including the Constitution Party, Dignity Party, the Socialist Popular Alliance Party, and the Bread and Freedom Party, in addition to public figures such as Hamdeen Sabahi, George Ishaq, Abdul Jalil Mustafa (the General Coordinator of the National Association for Change) and Mustapha Kamel Al Sayyid (professor of political science and director of the Center for the Study of Developing Countries at Cairo University).

Electoral system 
Originally upon its re-establishment, the body was to consist of at least 120 elected members and 60 appointed by the president. The House later fixed the numbers at 300 senators, with one third appointed by the president, one third directly elected in 27 single member constituencies coterminous with the Governorates under a two-round system, and the last third directly elected as well, under a closed party list system in four multi-member constituencies with a five percent threshold.

The distribution of seats by province is as follows:

Conduct 
The pro-government Nation's Future Party was accused of buying votes in several constituencies. The government was also accused of only implementing safety precautions due to the COVID-19 pandemic in areas that witnessed a large media presence. The National Council for Human Rights was also prevented from visiting several polling stations by the police, and some polling stations were said to have had insufficient ambulances and wheelchairs for people with disabilities and the elderly.

Results

First round 
Turnout in the first round was only 14.23%, amid opposition boycotts, general voter apathy, confusion over the role the Senate would have, and the COVID-19 pandemic. Only around 7.57 million valid votes were cast, and roughly 1.38 million invalid votes were cast, despite over 62 million voters having been registered to participate. A total of 74 of the 100 constituency seats were won in the first round, while 26 will hold run-off elections in September between the top two candidates in the constituencies. Out of the 74 determined constituency seats in the first round, 68 went to the Nation's Future Party, which has extremely close connections to members in the government of President Abdel Fattah el-Sisi. The Republican People's Party, another pro-government party, won five seats, and one seat went to an independent candidate. In terms of the 100 seats allocated from closed lists, the only closed list submitted was led by the Nation's Future Party (which holds 59 of the 100 spots in the list), although it included six members of two parties from an opposition coalition that opposed the constitutional changes that re-introduced an upper chamber of the legislature. According to Reuters, since the list got the support of more than 5% of voters across the country (the threshold needed for lists), and was the only one submitted, the National Elections Authority declared that it had won [all 100 list seats] by acclamation.

Second round 
Turnout in the second round was estimated to be even lower than the first, with only 2,884,757 voters participating out of a registered 28,217,880, for a turnout of approximately 10.22%. A total of 2,451,704 votes (84.09%) were valid. The National Electoral Authority appeared to contradict prior seat count reports from the first round for the Nation's Future Party according to one source, saying they had earned 50 seats rather than 59. The Nation's Future Party won 20 constituency seats in the second round, with 5 seats going to independent candidates and one to the Republican People's Party.

Notes

References 

Egypt Senate
Senate election
Senate election
Elections in Egypt
Election and referendum articles with incomplete results